San José was a 64-gun, three-masted galleon of the Spanish Armada de la Guardia de la Carrera de las Indias. It was launched in 1698, and sank in battle off Barú Island, just south of Cartagena, Colombia, in 1708, while laden with gold, silver and emeralds worth about US$17 billion as of 2023.

The sunken ship was located 600 m deep by the Woods Hole Oceanographic Institution (WHOI) in November 2015. In July 2017, it was announced that a salvage operation managed by the Colombian government would proceed.

Career 
San José was designed by Francisco Antonio Garrote and built by Pedro de Aróstegui at the shipyard in Mapil, Usurbil, Gipuzkoa, Spain. Construction started in 1697 and ended in 1698. They built twin ships simultaneously and named them San José and San Joaquín.

San José and San Joaquín were part of the Spanish treasure fleet during the War of the Spanish Succession, under General José Fernández de Santillán, the Count of Casa Alegre. On its final voyage, San José sailed as the flagship of a treasure fleet composed of three Spanish warships and 14 merchant vessels sailing from Portobelo, Panama, to Cartagena, Colombia. On 8 June 1708, the fleet encountered a British squadron near Barú, leading to a battle known as Wager's Action. During the battle, the powder magazines of San José detonated, destroying and sinking the ship with most of her crew and the gold, silver, emeralds and jewelry
collected in the South American colonies to finance the Spanish king's war effort. Of the 600 people aboard, only eleven survived.

Search and discovery 

The wreck of the San José is estimated to be worth billions of dollars, based on the speculation that it had up to 11 million 4-doubloons (i.e. 11 million 8 escudos gold coins, or 11 million coins each of 27 grams of 92% gold, totaling 8.8 million troy ounces AGW, or $11.5 billion) and many silver coins on board at the time of its sinking, similar to its surviving sister ship, San Joaquín. The silver and gold are from the mines of Potosí, Bolivia. The enormous value of this cargo has led to San José being called the "Holy Grail of Shipwrecks".

A group of investors from the United States called Glocca Mora Co., operating under the name 'Sea Search Armada' (SSA), claimed to have found the shipwreck off the coast of Colombia in 1981, but Colombia refused to sign a 65%/35% share offer and refused SSA permission to conduct full salvage operations at the wreck site. The Colombian parliament then passed a law giving the state the right to all of the treasure, leaving SSA with a 5% finder's fee, which was to be taxed at 45%. SSA sued Colombia in its own courts in 1989. In July 2007, the Supreme Court of Colombia concluded that any treasure recovered would be split equally between the Colombian government and the explorers. Sea Search Armada subsequently sued in United States courts, but the case was dismissed twice, in 2011 and 2015 on technical grounds, and the galleon was declared the property of the Colombian state. The Colombian government declined to verify that the galleon was at the coordinates stated in the case.

On 27 November 2015, the galleon San José was found by the Colombian Navy, though the discovery was not announced by then President of Colombia Juan Manuel Santos until 5 December. The discovery was made using a REMUS 6000 autonomous underwater vehicle. From the dive photographs, Colombian marine archaeologists have identified San José by her bronze guns engraved with dolphins. Colombia has claimed the galleon as part of its submerged patrimony, thus it is constitutionally obliged to protect and preserve the ship and all of its sunken contents. The government of Colombia has classified the location of the galleon as a state secret.

Conservation 

The Colombian Institute of Anthropology and History, a government agency ascribed to the Ministry of Culture, is in charge of overseeing all archeological sites in Colombia. The director of the ICANH, Ernesto Montenegro, has stated that soil, and sea depth studies are being carried out in order to examine the methods of extraction of the ship's contents. Then Colombian President, Juan Manuel Santos, has also stated that a museum will be constructed in Cartagena to host some of the contents of the galleon.

On 16 December 2015, the Office of the Inspector General of Colombia requested that the State, and the rest of the parties involved, be responsible for keeping thorough archives regarding the exploration and intervention of the galleon, requesting that the archives be turned in to the Ministry of Culture which is the governmental entity responsible for the underwater cultural heritage. The Inspector General also requested that a representative sum of the coins, ingots, and gemstones, which are not considered to be cultural patrimony under the concept of repetition, must be given to the central bank, Banco de la República, for preservation.

The Minister of Culture, Mariana Garcés Córdoba, stated that 2016 will be "a year of exploration, not extraction". According to the Minister, Colombia sees the discovery as a project of investigation that implies the creation of laboratories that will include the entailment of specialists from different work areas, in order to properly study the shipwreck and its contents.

References

Bibliography

External links
 Historical background to the sinking of the San José. Royal Geographical Society of South Australia.
 El Galeón San José y la batalla de Barú (Spanish)
 What Lies Beneath Vanity Fair

1690s ships
Ships built in Spain
Galleons
Age of Sail ships of Spain
Maritime incidents in 1708
Shipwrecks in the Caribbean Sea
Treasure from shipwrecks